Suncoast Estates is a census-designated place (CDP) in Lee County, Florida, United States. The population was 4,384 at the 2010 census, down from 4,867 at the 2000 census. It is part of the Cape Coral-Fort Myers, Florida Metropolitan Statistical Area.

Geography
Suncoast Estates is in northern Lee County and is nearly surrounded by unincorporated North Fort Myers.

The area drains south to the Caloosahatchee River.

Demographics

As of the census of 2000, there were 4,867 people, 1,815 households, and 1,196 families residing in the CDP. The racial makeup of the CDP was 95.17% White, 0.64% African American, 0.84% Native American, 0.23% Asian, 1.95% from other races, and 1.17% from two or more races. Hispanic or Latino of any race were 5.86% of the population.

There were 1,815 households, out of which 32.5% had children under the age of 18 living with them, 43.6% were married couples living together, 15.1% had a female householder with no husband present, and 34.1% were non-families. 24.3% of all households were made up of individuals, and 7.7% had someone living alone who was 65 years of age or older.  The average household size was 2.68 and the average family size was 3.15.

In the CDP, the population was spread out, with 28.6% under the age of 18, 7.6% from 18 to 24, 30.9% from 25 to 44, 21.0% from 45 to 64, and 11.9% who were 65 years of age or older.  The median age was 35 years. For every 100 females, there were 108.9 males.  For every 100 females age 18 and over, there were 107.3 males.

The median income for a household in the CDP was $26,510, and the median income for a family was $27,892. Males had a median income of $25,258 versus $15,570 for females. The per capita income for the CDP was $11,581.  About 21.7% of families and 23.4% of the population were below the poverty line, including 28.4% of those under age 18 and 12.2% of those age 65 or over.

References

Census-designated places in Lee County, Florida
Census-designated places in Florida